Amorphoscelis grisea is a species of praying mantis found in Côte d'Ivoire, Cameroon, Guinea and in the Congo River region.

References

Amorphoscelis
Mantodea of Africa
Insects described in 1931